The Best Little Whorehouse in Texas original soundtrack was released along with the film in July 1982. The album was produced by Gregg Perry. 

In addition to the score of Carol Hall songs recorded for the stage soundtrack, the film soundtrack included two Dolly Parton compositions:  "Sneakin' Around", which she performed as a duet with co-star Burt Reynolds and a reworking of her 1974 song "I Will Always Love You", the latter of which topped the U.S. country charts in September 1982. Unlike the original 1974 version, the 1982 release of "I Will Always Love You" crossed over to the pop charts (#53 Pop and #17 Adult Contemporary) as well.

Track listing

Chart performance

References

External links
 

1982 soundtrack albums
Dolly Parton soundtracks
MCA Records soundtracks
Comedy film soundtracks